Goucher may refer to:
Goucher College, a private liberal arts college in Towson, Maryland
Goucher Boulevard, a road in Baltimore, Maryland
Old Goucher College Buildings, a national historic district in Baltimore, Maryland
USS Culebra Island (ARG-7), a repair ship originally ordered as liberty ship SS John F. Goucher

Persons with the surname Goucher:
Adam Goucher, an American runner
Candice Goucher, an American historian
Dave Goucher, an American sportscaster
John Goucher, an American Methodist minister and college administrator
Joseph Goucher, an American actor and director known professionally as Eddie Dowling
Kara Goucher, an American runner
Len Goucher, a Canadian politician
Obediah Parker Goucher, a Nova Scotia political figure